Joshua Lee Turner is an American singer-songwriter, multi-instrumentalist, record producer, and internet personality based in Brooklyn, New York.

Early life and education 
Turner began singing at nine years of age and began playing guitar five years later, in January 2006. Over the next few years he became proficient at several other instruments, including banjo, lute, mandolin, bass guitar, violin, harmonica, drums and piano.

In July 2007, he created his YouTube channel, where he began posting covers of popular songs. His first viral video was his cover of "Sultans of Swing" by Dire Straits. As of June 2022 the video has 12 million views, and his channel over 600,000 subscribers.

Turner studied music at Butler University, where he also participated in the Butler Chorale, and was music director for the a cappella group Out of the Dawg House. In 2014, his senior year, he appeared on Good Morning America's segment "Open Mike" to perform segments of his cover of Paul Simon's song "Graceland," which became popular on YouTube.

Career 
In 2018 and 2019 Turner was a cast member in the touring show The Simon & Garfunkel Story and in 2019 starred as Paul Simon in Graceland Live.

Turner released his first full-length solo album, As Good a Place as Any, in April 2019,  and his second album, Public Life, on August 7, 2020.

In addition to his solo work, Turner is part of the folk duo The Other Favorites alongside Carson McKee. They released an EP, Fools, in 2017, an original studio album, Naysayer, in 2018, and a live album, Live in London, in 2019.  In 2021, the duo released the album Unamericana. 

Turner and McKee frequently perform in YouTube videos and on tour with singer-songwriter Reina del Cid and Toni Lindgren.

Discography

Solo

The Other Favorites

Other albums

Popular YouTube Videos

References 

American folk guitarists
Butler University alumni
Living people
1992 births